USS Robin (MHC-54) was an  in the United States Navy and is the fourth ship named for the robin. Robins keel was laid on 2 June 1992 and she was commissioned on 11 May 1996, at Naval Station Ingleside, Ingleside, Texas. Struck from the Navy list 15 June 2006, sold by U.S. General Services Administration for scrap, 8 May 2014.

References

 

Ships built in Bridge City, Louisiana
1993 ships
Osprey-class coastal minehunters